Toral is a Spanish surname that may refer to:
Francisco de Toral (1502–1571), Franciscan missionary in New Spain
Hernan Crespo Toral (1937–2008), Ecuadorean architect, archeologist and museologist
Janette Toral, Internet marketing specialist from the Philippines
Jon Toral (born 1995), Spanish association football player
Jorge Toral Azuela
José de León Toral (1900–1929), Mexican assassin  
José Manuel Martínez Toral (born 1960), Spanish association football player
Luis Roberto García Toral (born 1973), Spanish association football player
Marcelino García Toral (born 1965), Spanish association football player
Mario Toral (born 1934), Chilean painter and photographer
Remigio Crespo Toral (1860–1939), Ecuadorean writer